Glenea melia is a species of beetle in the family Cerambycidae. It was described by Francis Polkinghorne Pascoe in 1867. It is known from Borneo.

References

melia
Beetles described in 1867